Each of the Thirteen Colonies that became the United States when they declared their independence in 1776 had militia units that served on the Patriot side during the  American Revolutionary War.  The history of militia in the United States dates from the colonial era. Based on the English system, colonial militias were drawn from the body of adult male citizens of a community, town, or local region. Because there was no standing English Army before the English Civil War, and subsequently the English Army and later the British Army had few regulars garrisoning North America, colonial militia served a vital role in local conflicts, particularly in the French and Indian Wars. Before shooting began in the American War of Independence, American revolutionaries took control of the militia system, reinvigorating training and excluding men with Loyalist inclinations. Regulation of the militia was codified by the Second Continental Congress with the Articles of Confederation. The revolutionaries also created a full-time regular army—the Continental Army—but because of manpower shortages the militia provided short-term support to the regulars in the field throughout the war.

In colonial era Anglo-American usage, militia service was distinguished from military service in that the latter was normally a commitment for a fixed period of time of at least a year, for a salary, whereas militia was only to meet a threat, or prepare to meet a threat, for periods of time expected to be short. Militia persons were normally expected to provide their own weapons, equipment, or supplies, although they may later be compensated for losses or expenditures. 

Many of the states continued to maintain their militia after the American Revolution until after the U.S. Civil  War.   Many of the state National Guards trace their roots to the militia from the American Revolution.

The lists below show the known militia units by state for the original colonies plus Vermont.

Connecticut

Revolutionary War units:

Governor's Guard:
1st Company Governor's Foot Guard, 1771
2nd Company Governor's Foot Guard, 1775
 1st Company Governor's Horse Guards, 1778
 2nd Connecticut Light Horse, 1777
 5th Connecticut Light Horse, 1776–79
 Backus' Regiment of Light Horse, 1776
 Skinner's Regiment of Light Horse, 1776
 Starr's Regiment of Light Horse, 1779
 Seymour's Regiment of Light Dragoons
 1st Battalion State Regiment, 1776–77
 1st Regiment of Militia, 1778–79
 2nd Regiment of Militia, 1776
 3rd Regiment of Foot, 1775
 3rd Regiment of Militia, 1776
 4th Regiment of Militia, 1775–76
 5th Regiment of Militia, 1775–76
 7th Regiment of Militia, 1775–76
 8th Regiment of Militia, 1775–76
 8th Regiment of Militia, 1780
 9th Regiment of Militia, 1776–81
 10th Regiment of Militia, 1776–77
 11th Regiment of Militia, 1774
 12th Regiment of Militia, 1776
 13th Regiment of Militia, 1776
 16th Regiment of Militia, 1776
 18th Regiment of Militia, 1776
 19th Regiment of Militia, 1774-83
 20th Regiment of Militia, 1779–81
 21st Regiment of Militia, 1778–81
 22nd Regiment of Militia, 1776
 25th Regiment of Militia, 1776–78
 33rd Regiment of Militia, 1775
 Belding's Regiment, 1777
 Bradley's Regiment, 1776–77
 Burrell's Regiment, 1776–77
 Canfield's Regiment of Militia, 1781
 Chapman's Regiment of Militia, 1778
 Chester's Regiment of Militia, 1776–77
 Cook's Regiment of Militia, 1777
 Douglas' Regiment of Levies, 1776
 Douglas' Regiment, 1776
 Elmore's Battalion, 1776–77
 Ely's Regiment, 1777
 Enos' Regiment, 1776–77
 Gallup's Regiment, 1779
 Gay's Regiment, 1776
 Hooker's Regiment of Militia, 1777
 Johnson's Regiment of Militia, 1778
 Latimer's Regiment of Militia, 1777–78
 Lewis' Regiment, 1776
 Mason's Regiment of Militia, 1778
 McClellan's Regiment, 1777–82
 Mead's Regiment of Militia, 1779
 Mott's Regiment of Militia, 1776
 Newberry's Regiment, 1777
 Parker's Company of Teamsters, 1778
 Parson's Regiment, 1776
 Parson's Regiment of Militia, 1777
 Porter's Regiment, 1781
 Sage's Regiment, 1776–77
 Silliman's Regiment, 1776
 Talcott's Regiment, 1776
 Thompson's Company
 Thompson's Regiment, 1777
 Tyler's Regiment, 1777
 Ward's Regiment, 1777
 Waterbury's Regiment, 1776–78
 Whiting's Regiment, 1777
 Wells' Regiment of Militia, 1779
 Wells' Regiment, 1780–81

Delaware 

The first militia in Delaware was formed when Swedish settlers took up arms to defend Fort Christina (which was at the time a Swedish settlement) against Dutch invaders. During the American Revolutionary War, Delaware raised several units of militia in support of the Patriot side of the war. In the War of 1812, all of the Delaware volunteer units saw combat at Lewes, where they comprised the majority of force that drove off a British naval squadron seeking control of the Delaware River. Despite the federal government initially prohibiting volunteer units the Mexican–American War, a volunteer unit raised in Delaware would serve in the battles of Contreras, Cherubusco, Molino del Rey, and Chapultepec, losing so many men that the unit was nicknamed "The Bloody 11th." During the American Civil War, Delaware would raise multiple units in support of the Union cause. During the Spanish–American War, the 1st Delaware Volunteer Infantry was mustered into federal service but not deployed abroad. With the passage of the Militia Act of 1903, all state militia units were folded into the National Guard of the United States, largely turning the state militias from a state-funded and controlled force to a reserve component of the federal military.

Revolutionary War Units:
 1st Battalion, New Castle County, 1777
 2nd Regiment, New Castle County, 1778–81
 2nd Battalion of Militia, 1776
 2nd Regiment of Militia, 1780
 7th Regiment of Militia, 1782
 Flying Camp Battalion, 1776
 Kent County Militia
 Latimer's Independent Company, 1776

Georgia 

The Georgia Militia existed from 1733 to 1879. It was originally planned by General James Oglethorpe prior to the founding of the Province of Georgia, the British colony that would become the U.S. state of Georgia. One reason for the founding of the colony was to act as a buffer between the Spanish settlements in Florida and the British colonies to the north. 

Revolutionary War units:
 Emanuel's Regiment of Militia, 1781–82
 Georgia Hussars, 1736
 Liberty Independent Troop, 1776
 1st Brigade Georgia Militia
 1st Regiment Georgia Militia, Light Horse Troop

Maryland 

 Gale's Independent Company of Artillery, 1779–80
 Smith's Artillery, 2nd and 3rd Companies, 1783
 34th Battalion of Militia, 1776
 37th Battalion of Militia, 1777
 Extraordinary Regiment, 1780
 Flying Camp Regiment (Ewing's), 1776
 Flying Camp Regiment (Griffith's), 1776
 Flying Camp Regiment (Richardson's), 1776
 Lansdale's Detachment, 1783
 Marbury's Detachment, 1784
 Washington County Militia Company, 1777

Massachusetts 

Revolutionary War units:

 1st Regiment of Militia, 1776
 First Bristol Regiment, 1776–80
 1st Regiment of Guards, 1778
 3rd Regiment of Militia, 1779
 4th Regiment of Militia, 1777–80
 18th Regiment of Militia, 1775
 30th Regiment of Foot Massachusetts militia, 1775–1781
 25th Regiment of Foot Massachusetts Militia, 1775
 32nd Regiment of Militia, 1775
 Ancient and Honorable Artillery Company of Massachusetts, 1638
 Ashley's Regiment of Militia, 1776–77
 Bailey's Regiment of Militia
 Brewer's Regiment, 1776
 Brooks' Regiment of Militia, 1778
 Bucks of America, 1781
 Bullards' Regiment of Militia, 1777
 Burt's Company of Militia, 1776–77
 Cady's Regiment, 1776
 Carpenter's Regiment of Militia (First Bristol Regiment)
 Cary's Regiment of Militia, 1780
 Cary's Regiment, 1776
 Cogswell's Regiment of Militia, 1775–77
 Cushing's Regiment of Militia, 1777
 Denny's Regiment of Militia
 Fellows' Regiment, 1775
 French's Regiment, 1777
 Frye's Regiment, 1775
 Gage's Regiment of Militia (4th Essex County Militia Regiment), 1777
 Gerrish's Regiment, 1778 (Massachusetts Line)
 Gill's Regiment of Militia, 1777
 Holman's Regiment of Militia, 1777
 Independent Company of Cadets, Massachusetts Volunteer Militia (First Corps of Cadets), 1741
 Jacob's Regiment, 1778–79
 Johnson's Regiment of Militia, 1775–1777
 Hyde's Detachment of Militia, 1777
 Keyes' Regiment, 1777
 Leonard's Regiment of Militia
 May's Regiment of Militia, 1777
 Murray's Regiment of Militia, 1780
 Perce's Battalion of Militia, 1779
 Plymouth Artillery Company organized January 7, 1777
 Poor's Regiment of Militia, 1778
 Porter's Regiment of Militia, 1776
 Rand's Regiment of Levies, 1776
 Reed's Regiment of Militia, 1777
 Robinson Regiment of Militia, 1777
 Simonds' Regiment of Militia, 1776–77
 Smith's Regiment of Foot, 1776
 Sparhawk's Regiment of Militia, 1777
 Stearns' Regiment of Militia, 1778
 Storer's Regiment of Militia, 1777
 Turner's Regiment, 1781
 Wells' Regiment of Militia, 1777
 Whitney's Regiment of Militia, 1777
 Williams' Regiment of Militia, 1777
 Wood's Regiment of Militia, 1778–79
 Woodbridge's Regiment of Militia, 1777
 Wright's Regiment of Militia, 1777

New Hampshire 

Revolutionary War units:

 Baker's Company of Volunteer, 1777
 Baldwin's Regiment, 1776
 Bartlett's Regiment of Militia, 1780
 Bedel's Regiment, 1777–79 (also Continental Army)
 Bell's Regiment of Militia, 1781
 Bellow's Regiment of Militia, 1776–77
 Chase's Regiment of Militia, 1776–77
 Dame's Regiment, 1779–80
 Drake's Regiment of Militia, 1777
 Evans' Regiment of Militia, 1777
 Fogg's Regiment, 1776–77
 Gale's Regiment of Volunteers, 1778
 Gilman's Regiment of Militia, 1776–77
 Hale's Regiment of Militia, 1776–78
 Hobart's Regiment of Militia, 1777
 Kelley's Regiment of Volunteers, 1777–78
 Langdon's Company of Light Horse Volunteers, 1777–78
 Lovewell's Regiment, 1778–81
 McClary's Regiment of Militia, 1777–81
 Mooney's Regiment of Militia, 1779–80
 Moore's Regiment of Militia, 1777
 Morey's Regiment of Militia, 1777
 Moulton's Regiment of Militia, 1775–83
 Nichols' Regiment of Militia, 1777–80
 Peabody's New Hampshire State Regiment, 1778–79
 Poor's Regiment, 1775 (also Continental Army, aka 2nd New Hampshire Regiment)
 Reed's Regiment, 1775 (also Continental Army, aka 3rd New Hampshire Regiment)
 Reynold's Regiment of Militia, 1781
 Scott's Battalion, 1783
 Senter's Regiment, 1777–78
 Stickney's Regiment of Militia, 1777
 Tash's Regiment, 1776
 Waldron's Regiment, 1776
 Webster's Regiment, 1777–82
 Welch's Regiment of Militia, 1777
 Wingate's Regiment, 1776–78
 Wyman's Regiment, 1776

New Jersey 

Revolutionary War units:

 1st Regiment, Bergen County Militia, 1777–78
 1st Regiment, Essex County, 1777
 1st Battalion of Monmouth, 1777–82
 1st Battalion of Somerset, 1777–81
 2nd Regiment of Essex County Troop, 1778
 2nd Battalion of Hunterdon, 1777
 2nd Battalion of Middlesex, 1777
 2nd Battalion of Somerset, 1777–80
 3rd Battalion of Gloucester, 1777
 3rd Battalion of Middlesex, 1781
 Borden' Regiment, Burlington County, 1776
 Chambers' Regiment, Burlington County, 1776
 Crane's Troops of Horse, 1780
 Eastern Battalion, Morris County, 1777–78
 Forman's Regiment of Militia, 1776–80
 Hankinson's Regiment of Militia, 1777–79
 Holmes' Battalion of Militia, Salem County, 1778
 Hunt's Regiment, Burlington County, 1776
 Martin's Regiment of Militia, 1776
 Mehelm's Regiment, Burlington County, 1776
 Newcomb's Regiment of Foot, 1776
 Smith's Regiment, Burlington County, 1776
 Shreve's Battalion, Burlington Militia
 Randolph's Company, 1782
 Reynolds' Regiment, Burlington County, 1776
 Philip's Regiment of Militia, 1777
 Seely's Regiment of Militia, 1777–81
 Outwater's Battalion of Militia, Bergen County, 1777–81
 Summer's Battalion of Militia, 1776
 Thomas' Battalion of Essex Militia, 1776
 Van Courtlandt's Battalion, 1776–80

New York 

 1st Battalion Grenadiers and Light Infantry, 1776
 1st Regiment of Levies, 1780–81
 2nd Regiment of Levies, 1776
 3rd Regiment of Levies, 1780–83
 Albany County militia
 Cuyler's Regiment of Militia, 1781–83
 Wemple's Regiment of Militia (2nd Albany County Militia Regiment), 1777–80
 Schuyler's Regiment of Albany County Militia (Third Regiment of Albany County Militia), 1777
 Vandenbergh's Regiment of Militia, 1777
 Vandenbergh's Regiment of Militia, 1778
 Quackenbos' Regiment of Militia, 1779–80
 Van Rensselaer's Regiment, 1779–81
 Schuyler's Regiment of Militia, 1781–82
 Van Alstyne's Regiment of Militia, 1777–81
 Van Ness' Regiment of Militia, 1777–80
 Graham's Regiment of Militia, 1777–79
 Livingston's Regiment of Militia, 1777–81
 Van Bergen's Regiment of Militia, 1777–80
 Van Schoonhoven's Regiment of Militia, 1778–82
 McCrea's Regiment of Levies, 1779
 Van Veghten's Regiment of Militia, 1779–80
 Yate's Regiment of Militia, 1779–80
 Vrooman's Regiment of Militia, 1779–83
 Van Woert's Regiment of Militia, 1779–80
 Whiting's Regiment of Militia, 1777–81
 Tryon County militia
 Campbell's Battalion of Militia, 1776–82
 Fisher's Regiment of Militia (3rd Tryon County militia), 1775–81
 Ulster County Militia
 Snyder's Regiment of Militia (First Regiment of Ulster County Militia), 1776–82
 McClaughrey's Regiment of (Ulster County) Militia, 1776–81
 Allison's Regiment of Militia, 1775–78
 Benedict's Regiment of Militia, 1780–81
 Brinckerhoff's Regiment of Militia, 1777
 Budd's Regiment of Militia, 1776
 Cantine's Regiment of Militia Levies, 1778–79
 Church's Regiment of Militia 1776
 Clyde's Regiment of Militia, 1779–83
 Cooper's Regiment
 Crane's Regiment of Militia, 1779–81
 Drake's (Joseph) Regiment of Militia, 1776
 Drake's (Samuel) Regiment of Militia, 1776–77
 DuBois' Regiment of Levies, 1780
 Field's Regiment of Militia, 1777–80
 Freer's Regiment of Militia, 1777–79
 Golden's Company of Militia, 1776
 Hamman's Regiment of Militia, 1777–82
 Hardenburgh's Regiment of Militia, 1776
 Harper's Regiment of Militia, 1779
 Hasbrouck's Regiment of Militia, 1777
 Hathorn's Regiment of Militia, 1777–81
 Hay's Regiment of Militia, 1778–80
 Hearts of Oak (New York militia), 1775
 Hopkins' Regiment of Militia, 1779
 Humphrey's Regiment of Militia, 1776–77
 Jansen's Regiment of Militia, 1779–82
 Lansing's Detachment of Militia, 1777
 Ludington's Regiment of Militia, 1777–80
 Morrison co. Militia, 1776
 New York Provincial Company of Artillery, 1776
 Nicholson's Regiment, 1776
 Nicoll's Regiment of Levies, 1776
 Palmer's Regiment of Militia, 1776
 Pawling's Regiment of Levies and Militia, 1779–81
 Pawling's Regiment of Militia, 1776–77
 Poughkeepsie Invincibles (4th Duchess County regiment, New York Militia)
 Sacket's Westchester County Regiment, 1776
 Swartwout's Regiment of Militia, 1776
 Thomas' Battalion or Regiment of Militia, 1776–79
 Van Brunt's Regiment of Militia, 1776
 Van Cortlandt's Regiment of Militia, 1777
 Van Schaick's Battalion, 1776
 Webster's Regiment of Militia, 1780–82
 Weissenfels' Regiment of Levies, 1781–82
 Willett's Regiment of Levies, 1781–83
 Williams' Regiment of Militia, 1778–81
 Woodhull's Regiment, 1776

North Carolina 

The North Carolina militia units were first established in 1775 by the Third North Carolina Provincial Congress on the eve of the American Revolution.  Initially, the militia units were centered on the 35 counties that then existed in the Province of North Carolina.  The units fought against the British, Loyalists, and Cherokee Native Americans that aligned themselves with British forces.  The units included military district brigades established in 1776, county regiments, four battalions, and one independent corps of light horse. Four regiments were located in counties that became part of the Southwest Territory in 1790 and later Tennessee in 1796. The size of brigades could be up to a few thousand volunteers. Brigades were commanded by a brigadier general.   Regiments were commanded by a colonel and made up of a number of companies commanded by captains with about 50 men in each company.  During engagements, one or more companies of regiments may have been involved in actions and commanded by the regimental or brigade commander.  In 1778, Major General John Ashe was selected to command all North Carolina militia and State Troops.  Brigade commanders reported to him.  Separate from the North Carolina militia, the state provided 10 numbered regiments to the Continental Army that were referred to as the North Carolina Line.

The following are the North Carolina militia Brigades and Regiments, along with the dates established and disestablished.:

 Edenton District Brigade, 1776–1783
 1st Regiment of North Carolina Militia, 1780-1780
 2nd Regiment of North Carolina Militia, 1780-1780
 Bertie County Regiment, 1775–1783
 Camden County Regiment, 1777–1783
 Chowan County Regiment, 1775–1783
 Currituck County Regiment, 1775–1783
 Gates County Regiment, 1779–1783
 Hertford County Regiment, 1775–1783
 Martin County Regiment, 1775–1783
 1st Pasquotank County Regiment, 1775–1783
 2nd Pasquotank County Regiment, 1775–1777
 Perquimans County Regiment, 1775–1783
 Tyrrell County Regiment, 1775–1783
 Halifax District Brigade, 1776–1783
 1st Battalion of Volunteers, 1776–1777
 2nd Battalion of Volunteers, 1776–1777
 Bute County Regiment, 1775–1779
 Edgecombe County Regiment, 1775–1783
 Franklin County Regiment, 1779–1783
 Halifax County Regiment, 1775–1783
 Martin County Regiment, 1775–1783
 Nash County Regiment, 1777–1783
 Northampton County Regiment, 1775–1783
 Warren County Regiment, 1779–1783
 Hillsborough District Brigade, 1776–1783
 Caswell County Regiment, 1777–1783
 Chatham County Regiment, 1775–1783
 Granville County Regiment, 1775–1783
 Mounted Volunteers Regiment, 1780-1780
 Northern Orange County Regiment, 1776–1777
 Orange County Regiment, 1775–1783
 Randolph County Regiment, 1779–1783
 Wake County Regiment, 1775–1783
 New Bern District Brigade, 1776–1783
 Beaufort County Regiment, 1775–1783
 Carteret County Regiment, 1775–1783
 Craven County Regiment, 1775–1783
 Dobbs County Regiment, 1775–1783
 Hyde County Regiment, 1775–1783
 Johnston County Regiment, 1775–1783
 Jones County Regiment, 1779–1783
 Pitt County Regiment, 1775–1783
 Wayne County Regiment, 1779–1783
 Morgan District Brigade, 1782–1783
 Davidson County Regiment, 1783-1783
 Green County Regiment, 1783-1783
 Salisbury District Brigade, 1776–1783
 Anson County Regiment, 1775–1783
 Burke County Regiment, 1777–1782
 Guilford County Regiment, 1775–1783
 Lincoln County Regiment, 1779–1783
 1st Mecklenburg County Regiment, 1775–1783
 2nd Mecklenburg County Regiment, 1779–1780
Polk's regiment of light dragoons, 1779–1780
 Montgomery County Regiment, 1779–1783
 Richmond County Regiment, 1779–1783
 Rowan County Regiment, 1775–1783
 2nd Rowan County Regiment, 1775–1777, 1782–1783
 Rutherford County Regiment, 1779–1783
 Sullivan County Regiment, 1779–1783
 Surry County Regiment, 1775–1783
 Tryon County Regiment, 1775–1779
 Washington District Regiment, 1776–1777
 Washington County Regiment, 1777–1783
 Wilkes County Regiment, 1777–1783
 Wilmington District Brigade, 1776–1783
 1st Battalion of Militia, 1776-1776
 2nd Battalion of Militia, 1776-1776
 Bladen County Regiment, 1775–1783
 Brunswick County Regiment, 1775–1783
 Cumberland County Regiment, 1775–1783
 Duplin County Regiment, 1775–1783
 New Hanover County Regiment, 1775–1783
 Onslow County Regiment, 1775–1783
 Independent units
Independent corps of light horse, 1780

Pennsylvania 

On November 25, 1755, the Pennsylvania Assembly passed the Militia Act of 1755. This measure 'legalized a military force from those who were willing and desirous of being united for military purposes within the province.' This was as a result of citizens' pleas for protection from the French and Indians on the western borders. Two years later, a compulsory militia law was also enacted. All males between 17 and 45 years of age, having a freehold worth 150 pounds a year, were to be organized into companies. Every enrolled militiaman was required to appear for training, arming himself, on the first Mondays of March, June, August, and November. 

Revolutionary War units:

 Artillery Battalion, Pennsylvania Militia {Artillery Batteries of the Associated Regiment of Foot of Philadelphia},  1747
 1st Battalion Flying Camp, 1776
 1st Battalion of Bedford County Militia, 1777
 1st Battalion of Chester County Militia, 1776–77
 1st Battalion of Cumberland County Militia, 1776–77
 1st Regiment Flying Camp of Lancaster County, 1776
 1st Battalion of Philadelphia County Militia, 1776
 1st Battalion of Riflemen, Philadelphia County Militia, 1776
 1st Battalion of Westmoreland County Militia, 1777
 1st Troop Philadelphia City Cavalry, 1774
 2nd Regiment Flying Camp, 1776
 2nd Battalion of Cumberland County Militia, 17761777
 2nd Battalion of Northampton County Militia, 1778
 2nd Battalion of Riflemen, Lancaster County, 1776–77
 2nd Battalion of Westmoreland County Militia, 1777
 3rd Battalion of Chester County Militia, 1776–77
 3rd Battalion of Cumberland County Militia, 1776
 3rd Battalion of Lancaster County Militia, 1776
 3rd Battalion of the Northhampton County Militia, 1777–84
 3rd Battalion of Northumberland County Militia, 1779
 3rd Battalion of Washington County Militia, 1779–83
 4th Battalion of Chester County Militia, 1776
 4th Battalion of Philadelphia County Militia (4th Battalion of Associators ?), 1776
 5th Battalion of Chester County Militia, 1776
 5th Battalion of Cumberland County Militia, 1776
 5th Battalion of Philadelphia County Militia, 1776
 5th Battalion of York County Militia, 1777
 Andrews' Battalion of York County Militia, 1777–78
 Atlee's Musket Battalion, 1777
 Baxter's Battalion Flying Camp, 1776
 Barr's Detachment of Westmoreland County Militia, 1778
 Clugage's Battalion, 1778
 Burd's Battalion, 1776
 Clotz' Battalion Flying Camp, Lancaster County, 1776
 Duncan's Company of Volunteers (Pittsburgh), 1778
 Enslow's Company of Bedford County Militia, 1782–83
 Ferreis' Battalion of Militia (Lancaster County), 1776
 Haller's Battalion Flying Camp, 1776
 Hart's Battalion of Bucks County Militia, 1776
 Matlack's Rifle Battalion, 1777
 Miles' Rifle Regiment, 1776
 Lochny's Battalion
 Moorhead's Independent Company, 1777–79
 Philadelphia Brigade of Militia {Associated Regiment of Foot of Philadelphia/Associators of the City and Liberties of Philadelphia}, 1747 
 Philadelphia Light Horse Troop, 1780
 Quaker Blues
 Militia of York County
 Rankin's Regiment of York County Militia, 1777
 Reed's Volunteer, 1780–81
 Schott's Corps (Independent), 1778
 Swope's Regiment Flying Camp, 1776–80
 Watt's Regiment Flying Camp, 1776

Rhode Island 

Revolutionary War units:

 1st Rhode Island Regiment (Continental Army), 1775–1783
 2nd Rhode Island Regiment (Continental Army), 1775–1781
 1st Regiment Providence County Militia, 1781
 2nd Regiment Providence County Militia, 1781
 15th Regiment of Rhode Island Militia, 1775
 Artillery Company of Westerly, Charleston and Hopkinton, 1755
 Babcock's Regiment of Militia, 1776–77
 Bowen's Regiment of Militia, 1778
 Bristol Train of Artillery, February 12, 1776 to present
 Cook's Regiment of Militia (Rhode Island), 1777
 Church's Regiment (Continental Army), 1775
 Crary's Regiment, 1777–79
 Elliott's Regiment of Artillery, 1776–78
 Kentish Guards, 1774 to present
 Kimball's Regiment of Militia, 1781
 Lippitt's Regiment, 1776
 Mathewson's Regiment, 1778
 Miller's Regiment of Militia, 1778
 Newport Artillery Company, 1741 to present
 North Providence Rangers, 1775 to present (Co A, 2nd Bn, 19th Special Forces Group)
 Noyes' Regiment of Militia, 1777–78
 Olney's Regiment of Militia, 1781
 Pawtuxet Rangers, 1774 to present
 Peck's Regiment, 1780–81
 Porter's Regiment of Militia, 1781
 Richmond's Regiment, 1775–1777
 Tillinghast's Regiment, 1781
 Topham's Regiment, 1778–80
 United Train of Artillery, 1775 to present
 Waterman's Regiment, 1776–88
 Artillery Company of Westerly, Charlestown, and Hopkinton, 1756 to present

South Carolina 

Beaufort District Regiment, 1778
Berkeley County Regiment, 1775
Camden District Regiment, 1775
Casey's Regiment, 1782
Catawba Indian Company of Rovers, 17751776
Cheraws District Regiment, 1775
Charles Town Artillery Company, 1775
Charles Town District Regiment, 1775
Colleton County Regiment, 1775
Craven  County Regiment, 17751775
Lower Craven County Regiment, 1775
Upper Craven County Regiment, 1775
Fairfield Regiment, 1775
Forks of Saluda District Regiment, 1775
Georgetown District Regiment, 1775
Graville County Regiment, 17751780
Lower Granville County Regiment, 1775
Upper Graville County Regiment, 1775
Lower District Regiment (aka Dutch Fork Regiment), 1776
German Fusiliers of Charleston, 1775
Horse Guards, 1753

Vermont 

Vermont did not become a state until 1791, after the American Revolution.  New York asserted that Vermont was part of New York.

Revolutionary War units:
6th Regiment of militia, 17801781
7th Regiment of militia, 1782
Abbott's Regiment of militia, 1781
Clark's Company of militia, 17781780
Durkee's Company of militia, 17801781
Green Mountain Boys, 1777
Herrick's Regiment, 1775–83
Hoar's Company of militia, 1780
Marsh's Regiment, 1777
Mattison's Company of militia, 1782
Mead's Regiment of militia, 1777
Robbinson's Regiment of militia, 17761777
Weld's Company of militia, 1780
White's Company of militia, 1781

Virginia 

Culpeper Minutemen of 1775–1776
 Dabney's State Legion
 Ford's Company of militia, 1777
 Frederick County Militia, 1777
 Fluvanna County militia, 1781
 Gaskin's Virginia Battalion, 1781
 Illinois Regiment of Virginia Volunteers, 1783–84
Captain Johnson's Company of Mounted Militia of Augusta County 1780
 Monongalia County Militia, 1777
 Captain John Preston's Montgomery County Militia, 1777
 Pendleton's Regiment of Militia, 1777
 Taylor's Regiment of Militia (Albemarle County), 1779
 Virginia Legion
 Virginia State Regiment, 1775–83
 Western Battalion, 1781–82

Notes

References

Bibliography
 
 
 
 
 
 , bi-monthly muster rolls and payrolls, weekly strength returns, descriptive rosters, periodic inspection reports, clothing returns, as well as a potentially broad array of “miscellaneous” unit-related archival records

 
United States militia units